Eat Them! is a video game developed by FluffyLogic and published by Sony Computer Entertainment. It was released for PlayStation 3 on December 21, 2010. The game is a spiritual successor to Rampage.

Reception 
Video Gamer thought the title was "brilliant", though felt it could use more variation in its gameplay. Gamesradar thought the game was "fresh, fun, and satisfying". IGN thought the game had a "cool" idea, but that it was let down by its repetitive "smash stuff" game mechanics. Eurogamer thought the visual style was reminiscent of beautiful comic books. GameSpot felt that the stagnancy of the objectives and difficulty held the game back. Game Zone was disappointed by the game's multiplayer and health system, but appreciated the attention to detail by the developers.

References 

2010 video games
PlayStation 3 games
PlayStation 3-only games